The Mohall-Lansford-Sherwood (MLS) School District is a system of publicly funded schools serving the cities of Mohall, Lansford, and Sherwood, and the surrounding rural areas.  It is in North Dakota region 6, district 12.  There are two K-12 schools (one in Mohall and the other in Sherwood), with district administration offices in Mohall.

Schools
 Mohall Public School
 Sherwood Public School

External links
MLS school district website

School districts in North Dakota
Education in Renville County, North Dakota
Education in Bottineau County, North Dakota